Durham is a provincial electoral district in Ontario, Canada, that has been represented in the Legislative Assembly of Ontario since 1999 and from 1926 to 1975.

The Durham provincial riding was created in 1999 when Ontario adopted federal riding boundaries for provincial elections purposes. It was created from Durham East and Oshawa

It consisted initially of the Township of Scugog, Scugog Indian Reserve No. 34, the Town of Clarington, and the part of the City of Oshawa lying north of a line drawn from west to east along Taunton Road, south along Ritson Road North, east along Rossland Road East, south along Harmony Road North, and east along King Street East.

In 2007, the riding gained the Township of Uxbridge but lost all of its territory in Oshawa with the exception of the areas north of Taunton Road.

Members of Provincial Parliament

Election results

2007 electoral reform referendum

Sources

Elections Ontario Past Election Results

Ontario provincial electoral districts
Clarington